Defining Advertising Goals for Measured Advertising Results abbr. DAGMAR was an advertising model proposed by Russel H. Colley in 1961.

Details
According to DAGMAR, each purchase prospect goes through 4 steps:

 Awareness
 Comprehension
 Conviction
 Action

These steps are also known as ACCA advertising formula. ACCA/DAGMAR is a descendant of AIDA advertising formula and considered to be more comprehensive than AIDA. Developed for the measurement of advertising effectiveness, it maps the states of mind that a consumer passes through. Carol Kopp from Investopedia.com, describes the process entailing the DAGMAR model to also require "an evaluation of the campaign's success against a pre-set benchmark."

Important parts of the DAGMAR model are definitions of target audience, (people whom the advertising message is addressed to) and objectives (goals of the advertising message).

See also
 AIDA (marketing)
 AISDALSLove Model

References

Defining Advertising Goals for Measured Advertising by Solomom Dutka - Publisher: NTC Business Books; 2 Sub edition (April 1, 1995) , 

Advertising techniques
Promotion and marketing communications